USNS Henry Eckford (T-AO-192) was a Henry J. Kaiser-class fleet replenishment oiler of the United States Navy. She was never completed.

Construction
Henry Eckford, the sixth Henry J. Kaiser-class ship, was laid down by the Pennsylvania Shipbuilding Company in Chester, Pennsylvania, on 22 January 1987. Her construction encountered numerous problems. Although she was launched on 22 July 1989, her construction contract with Pennsylvania Shipbuilding was cancelled on 31 August 1989. Along with her unfinished sister ship USNS Benjamin Isherwood (T-AO-191), the incomplete Henry Eckford was towed to the Philadelphia Naval Shipyard in Philadelphia on 27 October 1989 for lay-up.

A new contract was awarded on 16 November 1989 to the Tampa Shipbuilding Company of Tampa, Florida, to complete Henry Eckford, and she was towed from Philadelphia to Tampa. However, construction problems continued, and that contract also was canceled, on 15 August 1993, when the ship was 84 percent complete. Cost overruns had run into the millions of U.S. dollars.

Reserve
The Navy decided that completion of Henry Eckford as an oiler was no longer necessary, and considered converting her into an ammunition ship, but the conversion was found to be cost-prohibitive. Instead, the nearly complete Henry Eckford was turned over to the Maritime Administration and towed up the James River in Virginia, where she remained in reserve in the National Defense Reserve Fleet as part of the United States Navy's James River Reserve Fleet at Lee Hall, Virginia. She was struck from the Navy List on 10 November 1997, and her title was transferred to the Maritime Administration on 2 February 1998. She and Benjamin Isherwood were the only units of the 18-ship Henry J. Kaiser class not to be completed.

Scrapping
On 19 July 2011, Henry Eckford departed for Brownsville, Texas, to be recycled by International Shipbreaking Limited.

References
 Jampoler, Andrew C.A. "Who Was Henry Eckford?" Naval History, December 2007, Pages 38–45.

External links
 NavSource Online: Service Ship Photo Archive: T-AO-192 Henry Eckford
 USNS Henry Eckford (T-AO 192)
 Ex-USNS Vessels to Depart for Texas

 

Henry J. Kaiser-class oilers
Ships built in Chester, Pennsylvania
Ships built in Tampa, Florida
Cancelled ships of the United States Navy
National Defense Reserve Fleet
1989 ships
James River Reserve Fleet